is a Japanese footballer currently playing as a defensive midfielder or a centre back for Fagiano Okayama, on loan from Hokkaido Consadole Sapporo.

Career statistics

Club
.

Notes

References

2000 births
Living people
Association football people from Hokkaido
University of Tsukuba alumni
Japanese footballers
Japan youth international footballers
Association football midfielders
Hokkaido Consadole Sapporo players